Mark Brian Roberts (born 20 May 1961) is an English archaeologist specialising in the study of the Palaeolithic. He is best known for his discovery of, and subsequent excavations at the Lower Palaeolithic site of Boxgrove Quarry in southern England. Mark Roberts is Principal Research Fellow at the UCL Institute of Archaeology. In 1994 he was awarded the Stopes Medal for his contribution to the study of Palaeolithic humans and Pleistocene geology.

Born in Chichester, West Sussex, Mark Roberts developed an interest in geology and archaeology at an early age, working at a series of local excavations before studying at the then-independent Institute of Archaeology in Bloomsbury, London (1980–83). His Boxgrove excavations, which ran from 1983–1996, revealed the best preserved Middle Palaeolithic site then known to archaeologists. In 1993, the project unearthed remains belonging to a Homo heidelbergensis, the earliest known hominin in Europe at that time. The results of these excavations were published in numerous articles and two English Heritage-funded monographs (1999 and 2020), and Roberts' experience of the excavations explored in the innovative archaeological (auto)biography Fairweather Eden (1998), co-written with fellow Sussex archaeologist Mike Pitts.

Recent work by Mark Roberts includes several excavations on the West Sussex downs, notably at Goosehill Camp on Bow Hill, an Iron Age enclosure previously excavated by the Sussex antiquary J.R. Boyden, and Downley, the location of Iron Age and Roman settlements and a Tudor hunting lodge. Both these latter projects were UCL Institute of Archaeology training excavations. He also co-directed (with fellow archaeologist Richard Morris) excavations on the Late Medieval house at Blackden, Cheshire, home of novelist Alan Garner.

Early life: 1961–1982
Roberts was born in Chichester, West Sussex, in 1961, and lived with his parents and three younger siblings (two brothers and a sister) in the town of East Preston. Initially attending the local County Primary School, his family later relocated to Worthing, from where he began attending Elm Grove School. Passing his 11-plus exam, he began studying at Worthing High School. He disliked school, although did both O levels and then A levels, whilst meanwhile maintaining an interest in fossils, which he collected from the local chalk pits. In 1978, Roberts volunteered to work on an archaeological excavation – run by the Sussex Archaeological Field Unit – of a Bronze Age site known as Black Patch in the West Sussex chalk downs overlooking Newhaven, a site that he would later tell an interviewer has remained one of his favourites for the rest of his life.

Developing an interest in the archaeological discipline, in 1980 Roberts began studying for a BA degree in the subject at the then-independent Institute of Archaeology (IOA) in Bloomsbury, London. He had been influenced in his choice of university by the fact that Peter Drewett, whom he had worked with through the Sussex Field Unit, occasionally lectured there, and because it was opposite a rugby club where he could indulge in his love for the sport. At the IOA, he played rugby for University College London (UCL) 1st XV during the first year, and rose to become captain of the team in the second, although during his third year of university studies left this club and signed on to play for Finchley RFC instead. According to his own account, it was during his time studying at the Institute he was "thrown out of the UCL union bar for a one man rendition of a lewd and sexist song" and was also "reprimanded for carving and planting a Chalk phallus in the trench of a particularly difficult excavator".

On breaks from his university studies, Roberts returned home to West Sussex, where he continued excavating with the Sussex Archaeological Field Unit at a project unearthing a prehistoric enclosure and field banks on Halnaker Hill, which overlooked the little village of Halnaker. Adjacent to Halnaker was a quarry, then being dug out by the Amey Roadstone Corporation (ARC), whose foreman, Godfrey Udeil, subsequently informed the archaeologists that his men had found a ditch and pot sherds dating from the Romano-British period in their gravel pits. The Institute of Archaeology decided to open up excavations of this ditch in 1982 and 1983, with Roberts being employed as supervisor for the first of these two seasons by site director Owen Bedwin. The excavations actually led to the discovery of a Romano-British farmstead, although the site also revealed evidence of older occupation; many of the excavators spent their free time hunting for the Palaeolithic stone tools – or "palaeos" – which were found scattered about the Quarry. Although he had never dug a Palaeolithic site before, these random finds began to interest Roberts, and when he showed them to the Department of the Environment's chief archaeologist Geoffrey Wainwright on the latter's tour of the excavation, it spiked his interest too.

Boxgrove Quarry: 1982–1996

Boxgrove Quarry was an area that had been quarried for several decades throughout the 20th century. The nearest village to the site was Halnaker, although Boxgrove was the nearest large village, and the site came within the boundaries of the Boxgrove civil parish, and it is for this reason that the archaeological site became known as "Boxgrove".

Initial survey: 1982

Having worked in the Boxgrove Quarry unearthing the Romano-British farmstead, Mark Roberts had become particularly interested by the Palaeolithic archaeology of the site, and decided that he would use this as the basis for his dissertation that was required to complete his BA in archaeology at the Institute. At the time "struggling to find money for beer and pencils", in 1982 he undertook a small survey of the quarry.

In his dissertation, Roberts drew on the wealth of recently published material about the geology and Palaeolithic archaeology of Sussex. Archaeologists had first began exploring various quarries in the Sussex area for Palaeolithic remains in the 1970s, taking advantage of the exposed geological layers that had been cut away in the preceding decades. In 1977 archaeologist John Wymer and geologist Roy Shephard-Thorn visited the area to gain a better understanding of its local geology, whilst the curator of Chichester District Museum, Andrew Woodcock, had begun a project to investigate Palaeolithic Sussex. Woodcock had noted the discovery of various Palaeolithic stone tools at the Slindon Quarry (which was near to the Boxgrove Quarry), and opened a small excavation at the site, unearthing a collection of lithics and several mammal bones that were in an undisturbed layer. Woodcock called on the aid of Shephard-Thom and other geologists to aid him in his study, eventually coming to the conclusion that the current understanding of Sussex geology was far too oversimplified.

Initial excavation: 1983–1992

In 1983, Roberts decided to begin actual excavation at Boxgrove.

Discovering hominin remains: 1993–1994

In 1993 Roberts decided that to answer a few questions about the site's geology that still intrigued him, he must open up a small-scale unofficial excavation, digging a few test pits with the help of Danish archaeologist Roger Pedersen (1929–). Facing particularly rainy conditions in the middle of winter, in Trench 5 Pedersen uncovered a large yet fragile bone which he subsequently removed within a block of protective silt. At the time, Roberts was away at a conference on Palaeolithic archaeology in Tautavel, France, and so Pedersen contacted Simon Parfitt at his home in London to inform him of his discovery. Suspecting that the bone had most likely belonged to a prehistoric deer, Parfitt did not immediately rush to Boxgrove, only inspecting it upon his next visit to the site; as Roberts and Mike Pitts later related in their account of its discovery:

It was so fragmentary, so many flakes and splinters, probably crushed by the pressure of the sediments it lay in, that it was totally unrecognisable. All [Simon Parfitt] could say was that it was a large bone. So with little dabs of UHU, he gently rebuilt Roger's find, until there were essentially just two parts, the two-halves of a long bone, a long longbone, broken across the middle. Then Simon drew the two lengths gently together. Bang. That's it: it's human.

Parfitt finally revealed to Roberts that he was "90 per cent certain" that the bone had come from a hominin in the middle of their annual Christmas dinner at the local Anglesey Arms pub. English Heritage eventually decided to issue a news release of the hominid bone's discovery on 16 May 1994, but stressed to the assembled journalists that they must not publish this discovery until 26 May, because the academic journal Nature  had obtained first rights to the story. Nonetheless, the journalists from The Times disregarded this, publishing a story on the bone in their 17 May edition that proclaimed "English Heritage finds the Oldest Human in Europe – and he is English".

Renewed investigations: 1994–1996

In 2011, Roberts told interviewers from the student-produced archaeological magazine Artifact that Boxgrove was "a fickle mistress indeed" and that whilst he wouldn't change his experience in investigating the site, the excavations "extracted a very heavy price" from him, "a price that I am only just at the point of paying the final instalment on". For this reason he found that he often hummed The Specials' 1979 song "Too Much Too Young" to himself when thinking about the project.

Publication
In 1998, Roberts co-wrote a book about the site with prehistoric archaeologist Michael Pitts that was entitled Fairweather Eden: Life in Britain half a million years ago as revealed by the excavations at Boxgrove. Published by Arrow Books, Fairweather Eden was designed for a popular audience. One reviewer of the book, A.M. Chadwick, noted that within it:

Mark Roberts, is given centre stage, but this is at the expense of other participants in the project. Almost prescient powers of perception and forward-thinking are attributed to Mark Roberts, and some of the book's more purple passages describe these… What we are presented is a picture of a lone archaeological warrior battling against the archaeological establishment. Whilst this may have been true of the project's early years, modern multidisciplinary research projects simply do not work like that.

Fairweather Eden was followed by the publication of the full archaeological report on the excavations at Boxgrove, co-written with Simon Parfitt. Boxgrove: A Middle Pleistocene Hominid Site at Eartham Quarry, Boxgrove, West Sussex (1999) was published by English Heritage.

Bow Hill and Blackden excavations: 1997–2012

Blackden in Cheshire was the home of novelist Alan Garner and his wife Griselda.

Personal life
Roberts is an atheist, and has a longstanding partner named Julie.

Bibliography

Books
Pitts, Mike; Roberts, Mark. (1998). Fairweather Eden: Life in Britain half a million years ago as revealed by the excavations at Boxgrove. London: Arrow Books.
Roberts, Mark; Parfitt, Simon. (1999). Boxgrove: A Middle Pleistocene Hominid Site at Eartham Quarry, Boxgrove, West Sussex. London: English Heritage Archaeological Report 17.
Roberts, Mark; Pope, Matt (2018). The Boxgrove Wider Area Project: Mapping the early Middle Pleistocene deposits of the Slindon Formation across the coastal plain of West Sussex and eastern Hampshire. Portslade: Spoilheap Publications.
Pope, Matt; Parfitt, Simon.; Roberts, Mark (2020). The Horse Butchery Site: A High Resolution Record of Lower Palaeolithic Hominin Behaviour at Boxgrove, UK. Woking: Spoilheap Publications

Articles and reports
Roberts, Mark (1996). "Man the Hunter returns at Boxgrove". British Archaeology, 18, pp. 8–9.
Pope, Matt; Roberts, Matt (2005). "Observations on the relationship between Paleolithic individuals and artefact scatters at the Middle Pleistocene site of Boxgrove, UK". In Gamble, Clive; Porr, Martin (eds) The Hominid Individual in Context: Archaeological Investigations of Lower and Middle Palaeolithic Landscapes, Locales and Artefacts, pp. 81–97. London: Routledge.
Roberts, Mark; Pope, Matt (2009). "The archaeological and sedimentary records from Boxgrove and Slindon". In Briant, Rebecca; Bates, Martin; Hosfield, Rob; Wenban-Smith, Francis (eds)The Quaternary of the Solent Basin and the Sussex Raised Beaches, pp. 96–122. London: Quaternary Research Association.

Pope, Matt; Roberts, Mark (2009). "'Clenching Authority': Joseph Prestwich and the proofs of the Antiquity of Man". Lithics 30, pp. 35–44.
Pope, Matt; Roberts, Mark; Maxted, Andrew; Jones, Pat (2009). "The Valdoe: archaeology of a locality within the Boxgrove paleolandscape". Proceedings of the Prehistoric Society, 75, pp. 239–263.

Stout, Dietrich; Apel, Jan; Commander, Julia; Roberts, Mark (2014). "Late Acheulian technology and cognition at Boxgrove, UK". Journal of Archaeological Science, pp. 576-590.
Roberts, Mark (2018) "The Institute of Archaeology Field Course at Downley Park, Singleton, West Sussex, UK. Multi period excavations around the hunting lodge of the Earls of Arundel". Archaeology International, 21, pp. 141–152.

References

Footnotes

Bibliography

 
 
 

Alumni of the UCL Institute of Archaeology
Academics of University College London
People associated with the UCL Institute of Archaeology
People from Chichester
English archaeologists
Living people
1961 births
People from East Preston, West Sussex
People from Boxgrove